20S-Hydroxycholesterol is a steroid of the oxysterol class.  It is a human metabolite of cholesterol.

20S-Hydroxycholesterol has been the subject of research into its role in human health.  For example, 20S-hydroxycholesterol has been found to be an allosteric activator of the Hedgehog signaling pathway, which has implications in cancer research.

More recently, 20S-hydroxycholesterol was identified as an endogenous ligand for the sigma-2 receptor, which had previously been considered an orphan receptor since its discovery in 1990.

References

Sterols